"Some Things Never Change" is a song recorded by Canadian country music singer Dallas Smith. It features American country singer Hardy, who co-wrote the track along with Rodney Clawson, Corey Crowder, and Jordan Schmidt. The song was released to radio by 604 Records as the sixth single from Smith's 2020 album Timeless.

Background
Smith remarked that while he was in the studio in Nashville, fellow Joey Moi-collaborators Florida Georgia Line were working on an album that Hardy had 11 co-writes on. Smith then stated "I watched him emerge as an artist. I cut a few songs of his in the past but getting a sneak peek at what he was doing as an artist, a lot of his rock-influenced in-your-face country music resonated with me because it’s kind of my jam. I love that stuff and he and I just kind of clicked". Smith also said the track "is a song [Hardy] had kicking around and I tried the verses a little bit, but Michael wrote those parts and they needed the twang that only he can do".

Commercial performance
"Some Things Never Change" reached a peak of #1 on the Billboard Canada Country chart dated February 6, 2021, marking Smith's sixth consecutive Number One and eleventh overall. It peaked at #55 on the Canadian Hot 100 in the same week, his third-highest entry there behind "Tippin' Point" and "Wastin' Gas". It also peaked at number 36 on the Billboard Hot Canadian Digital Singles chart in the week after the release of Smith's album, prior to the track becoming a single. The song has been certified Gold by Music Canada.

Music video
The music video for "Some Things Never Change" was directed by Stephano Barberis and premiered January 26, 2021. The video features both Smith and Hardy.

Charts

Certifications

References

2020 songs
2020 singles
Dallas Smith songs
Hardy (singer) songs
604 Records singles
Songs written by Hardy (singer)
Songs written by Jordan Schmidt
Songs written by Rodney Clawson
Song recordings produced by Joey Moi
Songs written by Corey Crowder (songwriter)
Music videos directed by Stephano Barberis
Male vocal duets